Vavali may refer to:
 Vavali Galleh
 Vavali Gardan